Narcosis a Peruvian punk band. Despite being active for little more than a year, Narcosis is regarded as one of the most influential of Peruvian rock bands. Their debut album, a self-produced cassette tape, has been called a "banner" and "point of reference" for Peruvian rock musicians, and the "most copied, recopied, and pirated album in the history of Peruvian rock."

History
The band has its origins in contacts made between Fernando Vial, Jorge Madueño and Alvaro Carrillo, when the latter two answered an ad placed in Segunda Mano ("Second Hand") magazine by Vial in late 1983. Carrillo later brought along a friend, Luis Piccini, who had a drum set. They originally named themselves "Los Descartables" (The Disposables or The Throw-Aways), and later "Los Descartados" (The Thrown-Away). Madueño soon took over as drummer, as Piccini was too often unavailable for practice as he had a girlfriend. The band then settled on the name Narcosis, which Vial has said was taken from the novel Siddhartha by Hermann Hesse

Narcosis' first gig was played at the Carnaby bar, where they filled the bill alongside now-classic Lima rock bands LeuZemia and Masacre, on October 6, 1984. Not long after that, the band was booked for another gig, this time at the Palizada Pub, but found itself short of a vocalist as Carrillo had left the group. Vial has said that Carrillo left the band due "reasons of fate", but elsewhere it has been suggested that part of the reason was that he and Carrillo had had difficulties. The spot was filled by Luís "Wicho" García, who was a friend of Vial's, and the band's final line-up was established.

Narcosis started practicing more, and writing their own music. In February 1985, they recorded their first album, Primera Dosis, in Madueño's living room using a portable 4-track tape recorder owned by García, which he rigged up with a microphone and a Walkman tape-player, thus allowing its use as mixing board.

The original run of Primera Dosis was of 200 cassette tapes. The album made an instant splash, being the first entirely-DIY rock album in Peru, and Narcosis was soon offered a recording contract by a Lima music label. The band, however, decided to continue independently.

Their second album, Acto de Magia, issued in September 1985, is a live recording of a gig performed at the Magia bar in Lima's Barranco district.

One of Narcosis' most notorious appearances took place on 17 February 1985, at the Rock en Rio Rímac festival in Lima's Rímac district. There, Narcosis played before a crowd of 5,000, alongside a number of other bands representing Lima's emerging "underground" scene. There was also a heavy police presence, and when Narcosis launched into their song "Sucio Policía" (Filthy Cop), the festival came to an abrupt end as the police showed their displeasure by firing into the air and rushing the stage.

In 1986 the band members drifted on their separate ways and into other projects. Vial joined the band Autopsia, García joined Miki González's band before becoming part of Mar de Copas, while Madueño joined the band Eructo Maldonado.

Narcosis reunited in 2001 for two 15th anniversary appearances, and have, since then, occasionally come together for other special events, sometimes with musician friends adding to the band's lineup. For example, they came together in 2007 for a concert in Medellín, Colombia and an appearance at Lima's "Onuba" dance club, for a series of retrospective 25th anniversary concerts in multiple Peruvian cities in 2011, coinciding with the release of a vinyl edition of Primera Dosis, and for a single show in mid-2013, and alongside more than a dozen other classic Peruvian rock and punk bands at the "Revolución Caliente" music festival in Peru's National Stadium in Lima, on October 25, 2014.

Members

Final
 Luis "Wicho" García - vocals, production
 Jorge "Pelo parao" Madueño - drums
 Fernando "Cachorro" Vial - guitar (Vial passed away on 24 October 2020)

Former
 Luis Piccini - drums (1984)
 Alvaro Carrillo "Gallito" - vocals (1984)

Discography
1985 - Primera Dosis, self-produced cassette album
1986 - Acto de Magia, self-produced cassette album
2003 - Narcosis, a retrospective CD produced on Fernando Vial's Pasajeros del Horror label.
2011 - Primera Dosis release on vinyl disc

References

External links
 Punk Outlaw's Exclusive Interview with Narcosis
 El Punk de Narcosis

Peruvian rock music groups
Peruvian punk rock groups
Musical groups established in 1984
Musical groups disestablished in 1986